The Bowlers' Club of New South Wales is a registered club located at 99 York Street, Sydney, Australia.

History
The club was established in 1958 and was granted a provisional liquor licence in that year.

Location
The club was originally located at the northern end of Clarence Street and relocated to its current premises at 99 York Street, Sydney in 1971.

Awards
The Bowlers' Club at 99 on York won the 2010 City of Sydney Business Award in the Pubs, Hotels, Nightclubs & Venues category.

Financial
The club made a Net Profit of $2,248,646 for the year ended 31 May 2010 and had Net Assets of $17,672,493 at that date. The profit includes a gain of $2,684,685 on the disposal of the club's 3rd floor strata

See also

List of restaurant in Australia

References

External links
 Official Bowlers' Club of NSW website 

Clubs and societies in New South Wales
1958 establishments in Australia
Sports clubs established in 1958
Bowls in Australia
Bowls clubs
Sporting clubs in Sydney
Restaurants in New South Wales
Coffeehouses and cafés in Australia
Licensed clubs in New South Wales